On September 4, 2020, Linden Cameron, an unarmed 13-year-old boy with Asperger syndrome was shot and seriously injured by Matthew Farillas, a police officer in Salt Lake City, Utah. Cameron was shot at eleven times by a member of the Salt Lake City Police Department after Cameron ran from his house during a mental breakdown. In 2022, the family and the city agreed to settle their civil case for $3 million.

Shooting
On September 4, Linden Cameron's mother, Golda Barton had made a 9-1-1 call asking for a crisis intervention team because Cameron was having a mental breakdown, and said that she feared Cameron could become violent. Barton said on body camera footage from the incident released by authorities, "I need him to go to a hospital. I cannot get him there on my own and I cannot do this every night." Barton said law enforcement were a trigger for Cameron. Cameron's grandfather, Owen Barton, had been killed in a confrontation with Lyon County sheriff's deputies earlier in the year. Golda Barton said in the body camera video, "He sees the badge and he automatically thinks like, you’re going to kill him, or he has to defend himself in some way. He freaks out. And he’s got a sensory disorder."

Two officers stayed near the home of Linden Cameron and Golda Barton, while an officer in the driveway spotted Cameron running. Officers gave chase to Cameron, and broke through the fence which he jumped over. An officer, identified in 2022 as Matthew Farillas, yelled, "Get on the ground!" moments before firing eleven shots at Linden Cameron. While on the ground, Cameron said, "I don't feel good. Tell my mom I love her."

Salt Lake City Police Sergeant Keith Horrocks and the Salt Lake City Police Department initially defended the shooter, claiming that officers were called to the address for a "violent psych issue" involving a juvenile having a "mental episode" and "making threats to some folks with a weapon." The SLCPD retracted these statements, later concluding that there was no indication or evidence to suggest that Cameron had a weapon.

Reactions
After the shooting, Cameron's mother, Golda Barton told KUTV, "I said, ‘He’s unarmed, he doesn’t have anything, he just gets mad and he starts yelling and screaming,’ He's a kid, he's trying to get attention, he doesn't know how to regulate. They're supposed to come out and be able to de-escalate a situation using the most minimal force possible... He's a small child. Why didn't you just tackle him? He's a baby. He has mental issues." Barton set up a fundraiser on GoFundMe for Cameron's medical expenses, which has raised $105,844 as of September 27, 2020. Linden Cameron's 17-year old brother, Wesley Barton said of the shooting, "It’s horrible. To see your little brother bleeding out, saying his last words. It plays in my head over and over." Wesley Barton also said that he had been told that Linden Cameron will probably not be able to walk again.

Salt Lake City mayor Erin Mendenhall said of the incident, "As a member of this community and as the mother of a 14-year old boy, I am profoundly heartbroken and I am frustrated. This shooting is another tragedy. It’s a tragedy for this young boy, for his mother, and for families and individuals who have acute mental health needs. I think the community will look at this situation and they will see themselves or their loved ones reflected in it." Salt Lake City police chief Mike Brown stated, "A 13-year old boy was shot and as a father of three sons, this has had an impact on me personally. I know that this has made an impression on the women and men of the Salt Lake City Police Department and of course you, the community we serve. I believe in the face of tragedy, we have a responsibility to analyze the circumstances that unfolded through a lens of learning."

Some accused the SLCPD of engaging in a cover-up due to the department initially falsely stating that Cameron had a weapon, when it was later concluded he was unarmed. Neurodiverse Utah said of the incident in a statement that "Police were called because help was needed but instead more harm was done when officers from the SLPD expected a 13-year-old experiencing a mental health episode to act calmer and collected than adult trained officers".

On September 20, 2022, Salt Lake City reached a settlement of $3 million in a lawsuit for use of excessive force filed by Cameron's family.

References

2020 controversies in the United States
2020 in Utah
2020s in Salt Lake City
Law enforcement controversies in the United States
Law enforcement in Utah
Non-fatal shootings
People with Asperger syndrome
Salt Lake City Police Department
September 2020 events in the United States